Charles Arthurson was the first aboriginal bishop in Canada.

He was born in 1937 in Norway House, Manitoba and ordained in 1972 in the Diocese of Keewatin. He has served in the parishes of Shamattawa (1966–70) as catechist; Norway House, Manitoba (1972–73); Big Trout Lake, Ontario (1974–76); Split Lake, Manitoba (1976–78) and Sioux Lookout, Ontario (1978–83). In 1983 the Arthursons moved to La Ronge, Saskatchewan, where he was elected suffragan bishop in 1989. He served half time as the parish priest in La Ronge, while spending the other half of his time in the episcopal ministry.

In July 2008 Arthurson retired as suffragan bishop.

References

Anglican bishops of Saskatchewan
21st-century Anglican Church of Canada bishops
Living people
Cree people
Year of birth missing (living people)
20th-century Anglican Church of Canada bishops